Bradley Wayne Selwood (born March 18, 1948) is a Canadian former professional ice hockey player and the former General Manager and head coach of the Oshawa Generals of the Ontario Hockey League. He played in the National Hockey League with the Toronto Maple Leafs and Los Angeles Kings between 1970 and 1980, and in the World Hockey Association with the New England Whalers between 1972 and 1979.

Playing career
Selwood played junior ice hockey for the 1968 Memorial Cup champion Niagara Falls Flyers before a professional career. He played two seasons with the Toronto Maple Leafs, but shortly after was lured by the New England Whalers of the fledgling World Hockey Association. Selwood played 431 games in the WHA with the Whalers, the third highest total in the team's history.

Selwood also played in the 1974 Summit Series for Canada against the Soviet Union. When the WHA merged with the NHL, he was claimed by the Montreal Canadiens, who still held his rights and who shortly thereafter traded him to the Los Angeles Kings. He played one season for the Kings and a few more seasons in the minors before retiring.

Post-playing career
He has served as a coach and executive for much of his retirement, notably with the Generals, Thornhill Islanders, London Knights, and Newmarket Hurricanes.

Selwood later served as President of the Markham Islanders of the GTHL.

Career statistics

Regular season and playoffs

International

References

External links
 

1948 births
Living people
Canadian ice hockey defencemen
Houston Apollos players
Fort Worth Wings players
Ice hockey people from Ontario
London Knights coaches
Los Angeles Kings players
National Hockey League first-round draft picks
New England Whalers players
New Haven Nighthawks players
Niagara Falls Flyers players
Oshawa Generals coaches
People from Leamington, Ontario
Toronto Maple Leafs draft picks
Toronto Maple Leafs players
Tulsa Oilers (1964–1984) players
Vancouver Canucks (WHL) players